Robert D. Bredow (born March 22, 1974) is an American visual effects artist. He was born in California, where he grew up in La Habra. He was nominated for an Academy Award in the category Best Visual Effects for the film Solo: A Star Wars Story.

Selected filmography 
 Solo: A Star Wars Story (2018; co-nominated with Patrick Tubach, Neal Scanlan and Dominic Tuohy)

References

External links 

Living people
People from California
Visual effects artists
Visual effects supervisors
1974 births